Richard Charles Froeschner (March 8, 1916 – May 2, 2002) was an American entomologist. He was born in Chicago, Illinois. He married Elsie Herbold Froeschner, a scientific illustrator, on October 6, 1940. He attended the University of Missouri in Columbia, Missouri.

His works on insects included:

Legacy
Taxa named in his honor include:
 Froeschneriella 
 Froeschnerisca 
 (Replacement name for Froeschneriella )
 Froeschneropsidea 
 (Replacement name for Froeschnerisca )

References

Further reading
 
 
 

1916 births
2002 deaths
American entomologists
20th-century American zoologists
University of Missouri alumni